Carlos César Neves (born 21 April 1987 in Uberaba), is a Brazilian footballer who plays as a right back.

Honours
Atlético Mineiro
Campeonato Mineiro: 2012, 2013, 2015, 2017
Copa Libertadores: 2013

References

External links
 Galo Digital 

1987 births
Living people
Brazilian footballers
Association football defenders
Campeonato Brasileiro Série A players
Campeonato Brasileiro Série B players
Campeonato Brasileiro Série C players
Criciúma Esporte Clube players
Guarani FC players
Boa Esporte Clube players
Clube Atlético Mineiro players
Club Athletico Paranaense players
CR Vasco da Gama players
Coritiba Foot Ball Club players
People from Uberaba
Sportspeople from Minas Gerais